Eva Le Gallienne (January 11, 1899 – June 3, 1991) was a British-born American stage actress, producer, director, translator, and author. A Broadway star by age 21, Le Gallienne gave up her Broadway appearances to devote herself to founding the Civic Repertory Theatre, in which she was director, producer, and lead actress. Noted for her boldness and idealism, she became a pioneering figure in the American repertory movement, which enabled today's off-Broadway. A versatile and eloquent actress herself (playing roles ranging from Peter Pan to Hamlet), Le Gallienne also became a respected stage director, coach, producer and manager.

Le Gallienne consciously devoted herself to the art of the theater as opposed to the show business of Broadway and dedicated herself to upgrading the quality of the stage. She ran the Civic Repertory Theatre Company for 10 years (1926–1936), producing 37 plays during that time. She managed Broadway's 1100-seat Civic Repertory Theatre at 107 West 14th Street (formerly the Fourteenth Street Theatre) from 1926 to 1932, which was home to her company whose actors included herself, Burgess Meredith, John Garfield, Norman Lloyd, J. Edward Bromberg, Paul Leyssac, Florida Friebus, David Manners, and Leona Roberts.

Life and career

Le Gallienne was born in London to Richard Le Gallienne, an English poet of French descent, and Julie Nørregaard, a Danish journalist. They married in 1897 and separated in 1903, later divorcing. After Eva's parents separated when she was four years old, she and her mother moved to Paris, and she spent her childhood shuttling back and forth between there and Britain. While in Paris, she was taken backstage to meet Sarah Bernhardt, which, she said "made an enormous impression on me". She made her stage debut at the age of 15 with a walk-on role in a 1914 production of Maurice Maeterlinck's Monna Vanna, then spent several months in a drama school. She left to perform in a minor comedy in the role of cockney servant, and "brought down the house", receiving excellent reviews.

The next year, at the age of 16, Le Gallienne and her mother sailed for New York City, where her first few productions were not successful, and she was released from another while it was performing in out of town tryouts. She then spent a season performing on the road and in summer stock. After travelling in Europe for a period of time, she returned to New York and became a Broadway star in several plays including Arthur Richman's Not So Long Ago (1920) and Ferenc Molnár's Liliom (1921) for the Theatre Guild. Le Gallienne became a naturalized United States citizen in 1927.

Le Gallienne consciously devoted herself to the "art of the theatre" as opposed to the "show business of Broadway", and was a pioneer in the emerging American Repertory Theater. She ran the Civic Repertory Theatre Company for 10 years (1926–1936), backed by the financial support of one of her lovers, Alice DeLamar, a wealthy Colorado gold mine heiress, producing 37 plays during that time. She managed Broadway's 1100-seat Civic Repertory Theatre (more popularly known as The 14th Street Theatre) at 107 West 14th Street from 1926–32, which was home to her company whose actors included herself, J. Edward Bromberg, Paul Leyssac, Florida Friebus, and Leona Roberts. As head of the Civic Repertory Theatre, she rejected the admission of Bette Davis, whose attitude she described as "insincere" and "frivolous". The Civic Rep disbanded at the height of the Depression in 1934, having mounted 34 productions. Le Gallienne was awarded the National Medal of Arts in 1986.

Le Gallienne never hid her lesbianism inside the acting community, but reportedly was never comfortable with her sexuality, struggling privately with it. She reportedly briefly considered arranging for a "front" marriage with actor Basil Rathbone.

During the early days of her career she often was in the company of witty, libertine actresses Tallulah Bankhead, Estelle Winwood and Blyth Daly, with the four being dubbed "The Four Horsemen of the Algonquin", referring to the Algonquin Round Table.

In 1918, while in Hollywood, she began an affair with the actress Alla Nazimova, who was at her height of fame, and who at that time wielded much power in the acting community. The affair ended reportedly due to Nazimova's jealousy. Nonetheless, Nazimova liked Le Gallienne very much, and assisted in her being introduced to many influential people of the day. It was Nazimova who coined the phrase "sewing circles", to describe the intricate and secret lesbian relationships lived by many actresses of the day. Le Gallienne also was involved for some time with actresses Tallulah Bankhead, Beatrice Lillie and Laurette Taylor during that time.

In 1920, she became involved with poet, novelist and playwright Mercedes de Acosta, about whom she was passionate for several years. She and de Acosta began their romance shortly after de Acosta's marriage to Abram Poole, which strained their relationship. Still, they vacationed and travelled together often, at times visiting the salon of famed writer and socialite Natalie Barney. De Acosta wrote two plays for Le Gallienne during that time, Sandro Botticelli and Jehanne de Arc; neither was successful. They ended their relationship after five years. In 1960, when de Acosta was seriously ill with a brain tumour and in need of money, she published her memoir Here Lies the Heart. The reviews were positive and many close friends praised the book. Le Gallienne was furious, denouncing de Acosta as a liar and claiming she invented the stories for fame. But many of de Acosta's affairs, including that with Le Gallienne, are confirmed in personal correspondence.

By early 1927, Le Gallienne was involved with married actress Josephine Hutchinson. Hutchinson's husband started divorce proceedings and named Le Gallienne in the divorce proceedings as "co-respondent". The press began accusations that named Josephine Hutchinson as a "shadow actress", which at the time meant lesbian. Five months later, Le Gallienne performed in a play about Emily Dickinson, titled Alison's House, which won a Pulitzer Prize.

Le Gallienne and Hutchinson performed together in several plays at the Civic Repertory Theatre, including in Dear Jane (1932), a play by Eleanor Holmes Hinkley based on the life of Jane Austen. Hutchinson was cast as Jane, and Le Gallienne both directed, and played her sister Cassandra Austen. At the play's end, Hutchinson's Jane refuses three male suitors in order to run off to an unmarried future living with her sister, Le Gallienne's Cassandra.

For a time after the Hutchinson scandal, Le Gallienne drank heavily. According to biographer Robert Schanke, the actress's anxiety over being lesbian haunted her terribly during this time. One cold winter's night, drunk, she wandered over to a female neighbor's house. During the conversation that followed, she told her neighbour "If you have any thoughts about being a lesbian, don't do it. Your life will be nothing but tragedy."

Another biographer, Helen Sheehy, rejected Schanke's portrait of the actress as a self-hating lesbian. Sheehy quotes Le Gallienne's words of advice to her close friend May Sarton, who was also a lesbian: "People hate what they don't understand and try to destroy it. Only try to keep yourself clear and don't allow that destructive force to spoil something that to you is simple, natural, and beautiful." Similarly, Le Gallienne told a friend, Eloise Armen, that love between women was "the most beautiful thing in the world." She starred as Peter Pan in a revival that opened on November 6, 1928, and presented the lead character full of elfin and boyish charm. The flying effects were superbly designed, and for the first time Peter flew out over the heads of the audience. The critics loved "LeG", as she became known, and more than a few favored her performance over that of Maude Adams, the first to play the role on Broadway. The Civic Repertory Theatre presented Peter Pan 129 times.

In late 1929, just after the stock market crash, Le Gallienne was on the cover of Time magazine. During the Great Depression that followed, she was offered directorship of the Federal Theatre Project of the Works Progress Administration by President Franklin D. Roosevelt. She declined on the grounds that she preferred working with "true talent" rather than nurturing jobs for struggling actors and actresses. She was instrumental in the early careers of Peter Falk, and Uta Hagen, whom she cast as Ophelia opposite her own portrayal of Shakespeare's Prince Hamlet.

In the late 1930s Le Gallienne became involved in a relationship with theater director Margaret Webster. She, Webster, and producer Cheryl Crawford co-founded the American Repertory Theater – no relation to the institution in Cambridge, Massachusetts, later founded by Robert Brustein – which operated from 1946 to 1948. In the following years, she lived with her companion Marion Evensen (September 28, 1891 – September 1971). In the late 1950s she enjoyed great success playing the role of Queen Elizabeth in Mary Stuart, an off-Broadway production.

In 1964, Le Gallienne was presented with a Special Tony Award in recognition of her 50th year as an actress and in honor of her work with the National Repertory Theatre. The National Endowment for the Arts also recognized her with the National Medal of Arts in 1986.

In 1982, Le Gallienne returned to the stage to play the White Queen in Alice in Wonderland at the Virginia Theatre, directed by Le Gallienne and co-directed by John Strasberg. This production was produced by Sabra Jones and was intended to initiate The Mirror Theater Ltd and the Mirror Repertory Company.

Although known primarily for her theater work, she has also appeared in films and television productions. She earned an Oscar nomination for her work in Resurrection, for which she gained the honor of being the oldest Oscar nominee up to that time (1980) until Gloria Stuart in 1997; and won an Emmy Award for a televised version of The Royal Family after having starred in a Broadway revival of that play in 1976. She made a rare guest appearance in a 1984 episode of St. Elsewhere which starred her former apprentice Norman Lloyd, appearing with Brenda Vaccaro and Blythe Danner as three women sharing a hospital room.

Le Gallienne also wrote the children's book Flossie and Bossie, a tale of two barnyard hens, published by Harper and Row in 1949. The book, a social satire and comedy of manners, revolves around the enemies-to-friends romantic friendship of two hens, one popular and beautiful, the other socially uncomfortable and plain.

On June 3, 1991, Le Gallienne died at her home in Weston, Connecticut, from natural causes, aged 92, and her ashes were scattered over her property in Weston, Connecticut.

Filmography

Film

Television

Source:

References

Bibliography

External links

 
 
 
 
 Items featuring Le Gallienne from a Chautauqua circuit collection at the Library of Congress
 Photographs at George Eastman House:   
 Eva Le Gallienne papers, 1903-1986, held by the Billy Rose Theatre Division, New York Public Library for the Performing Arts
 The Legacy of Eva Le Gallienne

1899 births
1991 deaths
Actresses from London
American film actresses
American stage actresses
American television actresses
American lesbian actresses
British emigrants to the United States
Emmy Award winners
Primetime Emmy Award winners
Outstanding Performance by a Supporting Actress in a Miniseries or Movie Primetime Emmy Award winners
English people of French descent
English people of Danish descent
English film actresses
English stage actresses
English lesbian actresses
LGBT people from Connecticut
English LGBT actors
Special Tony Award recipients
United States National Medal of Arts recipients
20th-century American actresses
20th-century British actresses
People with acquired American citizenship
People from Weston, Connecticut
Algonquin Round Table
20th-century English women
20th-century English people
20th-century LGBT people